Daniela Mareen Rath (born 6 May 1977 in Willich) is a German high jumper.

Biography
She finished fifth at the 2004 IAAF World Indoor Championships in Budapest. She also competed at the World Championships in 2001 and 2003, but failed to qualify for the finals.

Her personal best jump is 2.00 metres, achieved in June 2003 in Florence.

Achievements

See also
Female two metres club

External links

1977 births
Living people
German female high jumpers